Isinai (also spelled Isinay) is a Northern Luzon language primarily spoken in Nueva Vizcaya province in the northern Philippines. By linguistic classification, it is more divergent from other Central Cordilleran languages, such as Kalinga, Itneg or Ifugao and Kankanaey.

According to the Ethnologue, Isinai is spoken in Bambang, Dupax del Sur, and Aritao municipalities, alongside Ilocano.

Dialects 
Ethnologue reports Dupax del Sur, Aritao and Bambang as dialects of Isinai. However, Ethnologue also reports that the Aritao dialect is moribund.

Phonology

Isinai is also one of the Philippine languages which is excluded from - allophone.

Grammar 
Isinai contains a definite article with three different forms that vary depending on the relation of the noun.

References 

Perlawan, Sarah Eve. 2015. Grammatical Sketch of Isinay Dupax. m.s. University of the Philippines, Diliman.
Reid, Lawrence A., and Analyn Salvador-Amores (2016). Guide to Isinay Orthography. Baguio: Cordillera Studies Center, University of the Philippines, Baguio.

Languages of Nueva Vizcaya
South–Central Cordilleran languages